Oktisi is a village in the municipality of Struga, North Macedonia.

History
In 1900, Vasil Kanchov gathered and compiled statistics on demographics in the area and reported that the village of Oktisi was inhabited by about 840 Bulgarian Christians and 550 Bulgarian Muslims.

The "La Macédoine et sa Population Chrétienne" survey by Dimitar Mishev (D. Brankov) concluded that the Christian part of the local population in 1905 was composed of 1016 Bulgarian Exarchists. There was a Bulgarian school in the beginning of 20th century

Oktis Basilica
The Oktis Basilica was a paleochristian basilica in the northern part of the village of Oktis, but the church of the village (St. Nicholas) was built on the foundations of this basilica in 1927. In 1954, the Archaeological Museum of Macedonia undertook excavations of the basilica, which continued until 1994 under Dimçe Koço. The basilica has dimensions of 27.20 x 24.10 m., and consists of a narthex, exonarthex, side annexes and an intersection. It was constructed in a single phase. The floors of the central ship, the narthex, the crossroads, and the northern annex are filled with mosaics, decorated with geometric elements and fauna as well as a few preserved parts of the animal world. The Oktis Basilica is believed to originate in the 5th century as a sacred temple for the inhabitants of that early Christian period, which are hypothesised to be part of the wider ancestral population of the Albanians. The archaeological materials found in the excavations of the site are preserved in the People's Museum of Struga. It is possible that the mosaic in the narthex of the basilica represents the awareness of Christian unity among the early Albanian Byzantine Christian communities.

Demographics
Oktisi has traditionally been inhabited by Orthodox Christian Macedonians and Macedonian Muslim population.

As of the 2021 census, Oktisi had 1,925 residents with the following ethnic composition:
Turks 762
Macedonians 409
Others (including Torbeš) 342
Albanians 241
Persons for whom data are taken from administrative sources 171

According to the 2002 census, the village had a total of 2,479 inhabitants. Ethnic groups in the village include:
Turks 1,071
Macedonians 955
Albanians 346
Romani 1
Serbs 1 
Bosniaks 15
Others 91

References

External links

Villages in Struga Municipality
Macedonian Muslim villages